High in the City is a song written and recorded by American rock musician Lou Reed, released on his thirteenth solo studio album, New Sensations (1984). Released as a 7" single exclusively in the Netherlands by RCA Records, it was the third and final single from the album, but like the single that preceded it, "My Red Joystick", it failed to chart. "High in the City" is the only single released from the album that didn't have a music video made for it.

A reggae-tinged track, it features a trombone solo by jazz musician Tom Malone towards the end of it, Malone had also arranged the horns on the track.

Track listing
"High in the City"
"I Love You, Suzanne"

References

Lou Reed songs
1984 singles
1984 songs
Songs written by Lou Reed
RCA Records singles